"Candidatus Phytoplasma solani" is a phytopathogenic bacterial Phytoplasma species of the 16SrXII group, the causal agent of the black wood of grapevine. The black wood of grapevine disease is classified as part of the grapevine yellows.

"Ca. Phytoplasma solani" is also associated with the tree peony (Paeonia suffruticosa) yellows disease in China and tobacco (Nicotiana tabacum) leaf abnormality in Turkey.

See also 
 List of grape diseases
 List of tobacco diseases
 Flavescence dorée, another vine disease due to a Phytoplasma species

References

External links
 

Bacterial grape diseases
Maize diseases
Potato diseases
Tobacco diseases
Bacterial plant pathogens and diseases
Candidatus taxa